Phyllis M. Katsakiores (born September 22, 1934 in Wakefield, Massachusetts) is an American politician who represents the Rockingham 6 district of the New Hampshire House of Representatives. She previously served in the House from 1982 to 2012. Katsakiores also served on the Derry, New Hampshire Town Council multiple times, from 1985 to 1994 from 2003 to 2006, and from 2012 to present. Katsakiores worked prior as a newspaper reporter in Massachusetts and as a local grocery supervisor.

References

 Official page, http://www.gencourt.state.nh.us/house/members/member.aspx?member=332247 
 http://www.eagletribune.com/news/new_hampshire/katsakiores-tripp-win-derry-town-council-seats/article_b1d02684-769d-5b49-8c64-3383a9fb884b.html 
 http://www.bostonherald.com/photos/carly_fiorina_campaigns_in_new_hampshire   
 http://www.wmur.com/politics/gene-chandler-heads-list-of-13-nh-house-members-backing-fiorina/33462512  
 http://www.unionleader.com/article/20150609/NEWS06/150609132 
 http://www.unionleader.com/article/20150305/NEWS0606/150309499/0/NEWS03 
 http://www.newhampshire.com/apps/pbcs.dll/article?AID=/20140526/NEWHAMPSHIRE0201/140529252 
 http://www.concordmonitor.com/.../new-hampshire-gop-can...  
 http://patch.com/new-hampshire/.../jim-foley-to-launch-senate-run 
 boston herald as archived at http://www.pressreader.com/search?newspapers=1089&query=Katsakiores&stop=2015-06-03&start=2015-06-03 
 http://www.derrynews.com/news/candidates-sign-up-for-town-school-offices/article_772b1ba1-36c1-5ffa-ac87-543d3eec5643.html 
 govt cite later digitized by academia, as 1984 town of derry budget chair, http://digital.unh.edu/fedora/objects/derry:0093/datastreams/APPLICATION-PDF/content?download=true 
 http://www.derry-nh.org/Pages/DerryNH_TownCouncil/TownReport2014.pdf , see also http://www.derry.nh.us/Pages/DerryNH_BComm/Heritage , et cetera 
 ranking of state legislature candidates by a lobbyist organization, http://neanh.org/2014/10/21/nea-nh-announces-recommended-house-candidates/ 
 another state legislature ranking by a lobbyist organization, http://www.nhliberty.org/sites/default/files/2012_Liberty_Rating.pdf 
 more ratings, www.seiu1984.org/2014-endorsed-candidates 
 more ratings, www.teamsters633.com/images/teamsters11-06.pdf 
 more ratings, www.gonh.org/uploads/228/GONHvoterguide.pdf 
 see also George Katsiakiores, http://co.rockingham.nh.us/annualreport/2009.pdf 
 http://www.gwu.edu/~action/nhendorse.html 
 http://aboutmittromney.com/state/new_hampshire.htm  

1934 births
Republican Party members of the New Hampshire House of Representatives
People from Derry, New Hampshire
People from Saugus, Massachusetts
People from Wakefield, Massachusetts
Living people
Women state legislators in New Hampshire
21st-century American women politicians